The 6th Rivers State House of Assembly was formed after the 2007 general elections. The Assembly sat from 30 May 2007 until 30 May 2011. Representatives of the Assembly were elected from 32 constituencies with members of the Rivers State People's Democratic Party in the majority. The Speaker of the Assembly was Tonye Harry while the Clerk of the House was Alex Nwala.

Members

References

Rivers State House of Assembly
2007 establishments in Nigeria
2000s establishments in Rivers State